The Oktoberfest of Blumenau is a festival of German traditions that happens in middle October in the city of Blumenau, Santa Catarina, Brazil. It is considered the biggest German festival in the Americas, and the second biggest Oktoberfest celebration in the world after the original Oktoberfest from Munich.

It takes place at Parque Vila Germânica (Germanic Village Park), located in the Bairro da Velha (District of the Old Woman), and lasts for 18 days.

History 

The Oktoberfest of Blumenau was created in 1984, after a big flood of the Itajaí-Açu river, with the objective of recuperating the city's economy and raising the morale of its inhabitants. Even before that, owners of industries and commercial buildings in the city were already planning to start a festival like the original from Munich, but the flood was an important event that set the festival in motion. Since its first edition it has been a success, and today it has an attendance of about than 700,000/year. The event features folk dance (Tanzgruppen), shooting matches (Schützenvereine), German singing, folk costume and German cuisine. "Fritz" and "Frida" are the typical German characters. The "Vovó e Vovô Chopão" (Grandma and Grandpa Chopão, "Big Beer") are the official symbolic characters of the event.

In August 2020, officials cited the COVID-19 pandemic as grounds to push back the dates to November. But by early October, they decided to go on hiatus until 2022. The festival returned in October 2022.

Queen of the Oktoberfest 

A Queen of Oktoberfest is chosen every year. There are 10 candidates, who must compete wearing costumes in the categories of posture, resourcefulness on the catwalk, communication skills, beauty, and friendliness. If there are more than 10 candidates, there is a pre-selection. The first 3 are classified; the 1st place is elected as the Queen of Oktoberfest, followed by the 1st and 2nd Princess of Oktoberfest.

National Competition of Chopp in Meter Drinkers 

The National Competition of Chopp in Meter Drinkers is a competition that takes place during the event. By its rules, the competitor has to drink one meter of beer (600ml tulip) without drooling or taking the tulip off the mouth, the winner being whoever drinks in the least amount of time. Each night of the competition there is a winner, and at the end of the event it is known who has the fastest time on all days of competition in the two suits, male and female.

References

External links 
 Oktoberfest Blumenau (in Portuguese)

Blumenau
Folk festivals in Brazil
German-Brazilian culture
Blumenau
Tourist attractions in Santa Catarina (state)
Beer festivals in Brazil
Cultural festivals in Brazil
Festivals established in 1984